Eytinge is a surname. Notable people with the name include:

Harry Eytinge (1822–1902), American stage actor
Louis Victor Eytinge (1878–1938), American convicted murderer
Pearl Eytinge (1854–1914), American stage actress
Rose Eytinge (1835–1911), American stage actress and author
Sol Eytinge Jr. (1833–1905), American illustrator